Statistics of Belgian First Division in the 1965–66 season.

Overview

It was contested by 16 teams, and R.S.C. Anderlecht won the championship.

League standings

Results

References

Belgian Pro League seasons
Belgian
1965–66 in Belgian football